Alpha Caeli (α Cae, α Caeli) is a double star system in the constellation Caelum.

Physical Properties

Primary 
Alpha Caeli A is an F-type main sequence star with a stellar classification of F2V and an apparent magnitude of +4.44. It has 1.48 times the mass of the Sun and 1.3 times the solar radius. The projected rotational velocity at the stellar equator is 47.8 km/s. It is suspected of being a Delta Scuti variable star.

Companion + Orbit 
The companion is a spectral class M0.5V red dwarf star with absolute magnitude 9.80. It is a UV Ceti variable star that undergoes random increases in luminosity. This star is currently separated from the primary by an angle of 6.6 arcseconds, which indicates an orbit with a semimajor axis whose expected value is 206 AU.

Motion 
Alpha Caeli is approximately 65.7 light years from Earth and is an estimated 900 million years old. The space velocity components of this system are U = 10, V = 6 and W = -10 km/s. It is orbiting the Milky Way galaxy at an average distance of 8.006 kpc from the core and with an orbital eccentricity of 0.07. This orbit lies close to the galactic plane, and the system travels no more than 0.05 kpc above or below this plane.  Alpha Caeli is probably a member of the Ursa Major moving group of stars that have similar kinematic properties and probably originated from the same star cluster.

References

Caeli, Alpha
Caelum
F-type main-sequence stars
029875
021770
CD-42 01587
Binary stars
1502
Gliese and GJ objects